Chen Jingrun (22 May 1933 – 19 March 1996), also known as Jing-Run Chen, was a Chinese mathematician who made significant contributions to number theory, including Chen's theorem and the Chen prime.

Life and career
Chen was the third son in a large family from Fuzhou, Fujian, China.  His father was a postal worker. Chen Jingrun graduated from the Mathematics Department of Xiamen University in 1953. His advisor at the Chinese Academy of Sciences was Hua Luogeng.

His work on the twin prime conjecture, Waring's problem, Goldbach's conjecture and Legendre's conjecture led to progress in analytic number theory. In a 1966 paper he proved what is now called Chen's theorem: every sufficiently large even number can be written as the sum of a prime and a semiprime (the product of two primes) – e.g., 100 = 23 + 7·11. Despite being persecuted during the Cultural Revolution, he expanded his proof in the 1970s.

After the end of the Cultural Revolution, Xu Chi wrote a biography of Chen entitled Goldbach's Conjecture. First published in People's Literature in January 1978, it was reprinted on the People's Daily a month later and became a national sensation. Chen became a household name in China and received a sackful of love letters from all over the country within two months.

Chen died of complications of pneumonia on March 19, 1996, at the age of 63 years.

Legacy

The asteroid 7681 Chenjingrun, discovered in 1996, was named after him.

In 1999, China issued an 80-cent postage stamp, titled The Best Result of Goldbach Conjecture, with a silhouette of Chen and the inequality:

 

Several statues in China have been built in memory of Chen. At Xiamen University, the names of Chen and four other mathematicians — Peter Gustav Lejeune Dirichlet, Matti Jutila, Yuri Linnik, and Pan Chengdong — are inscribed in the marble slab behind Chen's statue (see image).

Works
J.-R. Chen, On the representation of a large even integer as the sum of a prime and a product of at most two primes, Sci. Sinica 16 (1973), 157–176.
Chen, J.R, "On the representation of a large even integer as the sum of a prime and the product of at most two primes". [Chinese] J. Kexue Tongbao 17 (1966), 385–386.
"Fundamental Number Theory"

References

Pan Chengdong and Wang Yuan, Chen Jingrun: a brief outline of his life and works, Acta Math. Sinica (NS) 12 (1996) 225–233.

External links

Chen's home page at the Chinese Institute of Mathematics.

1933 births
1996 deaths
20th-century Chinese mathematicians
Members of the Chinese Academy of Sciences
Number theorists
Educators from Fujian
Academic staff of Guizhou Nationalities University
Academic staff of Henan University
Academic staff of Xiamen University
Academic staff of Qingdao University
Academic staff of Huazhong University of Science and Technology
Academic staff of Fujian Normal University
People from Fuzhou
Mathematicians from Fujian
Xiamen University alumni
Delegates to the 4th National People's Congress
Delegates to the 5th National People's Congress
Delegates to the 6th National People's Congress